The Uzbek invasion of Khorasan took place in 1578. Jalal khan Uzbek (governor of Merv) led the Uzbek troops. Tahmasp I guaranteed to pay 300 Tomans to the Uzbeks to convince them not to invade the bondmen and nomads of Khorasan. The tribute was not paid after Tahmasp I's death however, and Jalal khan Uzbek raided Khorasan. The battles of Jalal khan Uzbek and Mortaza Gholi Khan Parnak Turkaman were quite harsh. Jalal khan Uzbek's head was cut off and the Uzbeks pulled back to their territory.

References 

 Biography of Abbas I (Persian Language) 2012 . 
 Internal tribal struggles, Uzbek unrest in Khurasan angelfire

Battles involving Safavid Iran
Khanate of Bukhara
Conflicts in 1578
Invasions